Angeline Maria Catharina (Angelien) Eijsink (born 1 April 1960 in St. Isidorushoeve) is a Dutch politician and former civil servant and educator. As a member of the Labour Party (Partij van de Arbeid) she was an MP between 30 January 2003 and 23 March 2017. She focused on matters of the Dutch defense.

Life and career

Career diplomat, 1995–2003
From 1995, Eijsink was a career diplomat at the Ministry of Foreign Affairs. Among other positions, she held the position of Head of the Southern Africa Division of the Sub-Saharan Africa Department.

Member of Parliament, 2003–2017
Eijsink was a Member of the Dutch House of Representatives since the 2003 national elections. Since 2013, she served as chairwoman of the Committee on Foreign Affairs. She also was a member of the committees on Defence, European Affairs, Public Expenditure, Foreign Trade and Development Cooperation, Housing and the Central Government Sector, and Kingdom Relations.

Other activities
 Netherlands Atlantic Association, Member of the Board of Directors 
 Association of Active Veterans, Member  of  the  Board  of  Recommendation  of  the 
 Centre for European Security Studies (CESS), Member  of  the  Board  of  Directors

References 
  Parlement.com biography

External links 

  House of Representatives biography

1960 births
Living people
Dutch civil servants
Dutch educators
Dutch women educators
Labour Party (Netherlands) politicians
Members of the House of Representatives (Netherlands)
People from Haaksbergen
21st-century Dutch politicians
21st-century Dutch women politicians